Island Air may refer to:

 Island Air (Hawaii), a former commuter airline in Hawaii, US
 Island Air (Cayman Islands)
 Island Airlines, an air shuttle between Nantucket and mainland Cape Cod as well as additional service in the northeast US
 Island Airways, an air shuttle between Charlevoix and Beaver Island, Michigan, US